Xi Zezong (June 6, 1927, Yuanqu, Shanxi – December 27, 2008, Beijing) was a Chinese astronomer, historian, and translator. He was a member of the Chinese Academy of Sciences, and an awardee of the Astronomy Prize.

He identified a possible reference to one of the Galilean moons of Jupiter in the fragmentary ancient works of the 4th-century BC Chinese astronomer Gan De, who may have made observation of either Ganymede or Callisto in summer 365.

Honors 
Asteroid 85472 Xizezong, discovered by the Beijing Schmidt CCD Asteroid Program in 1997, was named in his honor. The official  was published by the Minor Planet Center on April 2, 2007.

References

External links
 85472 Xizezong, JPL Small-Body Database Browser

1927 births
2008 deaths
20th-century Chinese translators
21st-century Chinese translators
20th-century Chinese astronomers
Historians from Shanxi
Historians of astronomy
Members of the Chinese Academy of Sciences
People from Yuncheng
People's Republic of China historians
People's Republic of China science writers
People's Republic of China translators
Scientists from Shanxi